A Little Bit of Wisdom is a British television series which aired from 1974 to 1976. A comedy show, it was produced by Associated Television and starred Norman Wisdom. All 20 episodes are missing, and are believed to be lost.

Cast
Norman Wisdom as Norman
Neil McCarthy as Alec Potter 
Frances White as Linda Clark
Robert Keegan as Albert Clark

References

External links

1974 British television series debuts
1976 British television series endings
Lost television shows
English-language television shows
1970s British comedy television series
Television shows produced by Associated Television (ATV)